George Craddock (26 February 1897 – 28 April 1974) was a British Labour politician.

Born in Kettering, Craddock was educated at Fircroft College in Bournville, and then at the University of Birmingham.  He became active in the Labour Party, serving as a full-time political agent from 1929 until 1936, after which he became an area organiser with the National Union of Distributive and Allied Workers, based in Sheffield.  He won election to Sheffield City Council, serving until 1950.

He was elected Member of Parliament (MP) for Bradford South at a 1949 by-election, and served until his retirement at the 1970 general election.  From November 1954 until April 1955, his Labour Party whip was withdrawn.

He should not be confused with Sir George Beresford Craddock who served as a Conservative MP at around the same time.

References

External links 
 

1897 births
1974 deaths
Labour Party (UK) MPs for English constituencies
UK MPs 1945–1950
UK MPs 1950–1951
UK MPs 1951–1955
UK MPs 1955–1959
UK MPs 1959–1964
UK MPs 1964–1966
UK MPs 1966–1970
Alumni of the University of Birmingham
Politicians from Bradford